Paperchase is an international chain of stationery stores which was established in the United Kingdom but has since expanded into Europe, the USA and United Arab Emirates. As well as stand alone stores, in the UK there are concessions in selected Selfridges, House of Fraser and Next stores. The company went into administration on 30 January 2023 and Tesco purchased the brand and intellectual property, but not the stores, on 31 January 2023.

History
Paperchase was founded by two art students, Judith Cash and Eddie Pond, around 1968. The company went through various owners before receiving investment from W H Smith in 1985; it continued to expand and in 1996 became Paperchase Products Ltd., having been bought by the existing management with investment from a venture capital fund.

In 2004 Borders Group Inc. bought out Graphite Capital, and the company grew internationally within the Borders network.

In 2007 Borders sold a majority stake in the UK and Irish division of Borders book stores to Risk Capital for £10 million.

In May 2008, the Borders Group announced it was considering selling its 97% share to one of either HgCapital, Isis Equity Partners or Change Capital, with W H Smith interested in putting in a £50 million bid – 12 years after selling it at £1 million.

With the administration and closure of Borders in late 2009, the company lost a large presence on the British high street as there was a Paperchase concession within every UK Borders. The UK division of Borders separated from its parent and the owner of Paperchase in 2007, and all Borders stores closed on 22 December 2009. To replace these lost UK retail sites, Paperchase concessions were formed in a number of HMV and Waterstones stores during 2010.

In 2010, a management buy-out was completed leaving the company owned by Primary Capital Partners LLP and its board of directors.

In September 2010, Paperchase launched an online store, built on the Venda ecommerce platform.

As of January 2013, the company had over 130 retail points of sale, a mix of concessions and standalone stores. These were primarily based in the UK, with several in Dubai and a few in Denmark, The Netherlands, France and Germany. One of their first flagship stores was on Tottenham Court Road and was known as 'Paperchase Heaven' because of its location, size and range of products. A new store opened in the White Rose Centre in Leeds in June 2013, and another flagship store was opened in March 2013 at Buchanan Street in Glasgow.

In January 2021, Paperchase was on the brink of administration after most of its stores were closed over the Christmas period because of COVID-19. The firm filed a notice to appoint administrators to give them breathing space while it worked out a rescue plan.  At that time the company had 127 stores and about 1,500 employees. Later that month it was announced that Paperchase would be purchased by Primera Capital through a legal entity, Aspen Phoenix Newco Limited.

In August 2022, Paperchase was sold again to a private investment firm led by the retail investor Steve Curtis. The company went into administration on 30 January 2023 and Tesco purchased the brand and intellectual property, but not its 106 stores, on 31 January 2023, leaving the future of 820 staff in doubt.

Controversy
In February 2010, the company was accused of stealing artwork created by an independent British artist, Hidden Eloise. An artist working for the agency Gather No Moss eventually admitted tracing the artwork.

In November 2017, the company issued an apology for running an advert for free wrapping paper in the Daily Mail on Saturday 18 November, following a campaign by the group Stop Funding Hate. Journalists Julia Hartley-Brewer and Piers Morgan condemned the decision.

References

External links
 

Tesco
Stationers of the United Kingdom
Retail companies of the United Kingdom
1968 establishments in England
Retail companies established in 1968